Connie-Leigh Rixon (born 12 May 1997) is a Maltese international lawn bowler.

Biography
She was born in Nambour, Queensland, Australia and was selected as part of the Maltese team for the 2018 Commonwealth Games on the Gold Coast in Queensland where she claimed a bronze medal in the Fours with Rebecca Rixon (her sister), Rosemaree Rixon (her mother) and Sharon Callus.

In 2020, she was selected for the 2020 World Outdoor Bowls Championship in Australia.

In 2022, she competed in the women's pairs and the Women's fours at the 2022 Commonwealth Games in Birmingham.

References

1997 births
Living people
Bowls players at the 2018 Commonwealth Games
Bowls players at the 2022 Commonwealth Games
Commonwealth Games bronze medallists for Malta
Commonwealth Games medallists in lawn bowls
Maltese bowls players
Medallists at the 2018 Commonwealth Games